Bob Delaney (born ) is a former politician in Ontario, Canada. He was the Liberal member of the Legislative Assembly of Ontario from 2003 to 2018 who represented the ridings of Mississauga West and Mississauga—Streetsville.

Background
Delaney was born in Montreal, Quebec, and has a Bachelor of Science degree in physics from Concordia University in that city. He received a Master of Arts degree in business administration from Simon Fraser University in British Columbia in 1988, and has received accreditation from the Canadian Public Relations Society. He has lived primarily in Mississauga since 1983.

Politics
Delaney ran for the Ontario legislature in the provincial election of 1999 losing to Progressive Conservative cabinet minister John Snobelen by about 9,000 votes in the riding of Mississauga West.  After Snobelen  resigned from the legislature in early 2003 Delaney ran for the Liberals again in the provincial election of 2003, this time defeating Progressive Conservative candidate Nina Tangri by over 7,000 votes. He was re-elected in 2007, 2011 and 2014.

In 2006, Delaney was appointed the parliamentary assistant (PA) to the Minister Responsible for Seniors. He has subsequently served as PA to the Minister of Research and Innovation, the Minister of Tourism, the Minister of Revenue, the Minister of Education and the Minister of Energy. He also served as chair of the Standing Committee on Finance and Economic Affairs from 2011 to 2013.

On March 25, 2014, he was named Chief Government Whip.

In May 2016, Delaney issued a statement apologizing to a mother who had informed his constituency staff that she was planning to distribute pamphlets at his office protesting changes in the autism program that would affect her son and was subsequently visited by officers of the Peel Regional Police who told her that she could not touch the office door while protesting.

In March 2018, Delaney responded to a question by The Mississauga News by boasting that his Liberal government had increased the provincial debt: "We have tripled the debt and we're proud of it, because we can afford it. It's the responsible thing to do. It's the correct thing to do, it's what people have asked us to do and I would do it again and do it proudly". Delaney initially denied having made the statement in an e-mail to Global News Radio AM 640. However, he subsequently admitted to it and apologized.

Electoral record

References

External links

1953 births
21st-century Canadian politicians
Anglophone Quebec people
Concordia University alumni
Living people
Ontario Liberal Party MPPs
Politicians from Mississauga
Politicians from Montreal
Simon Fraser University alumni